Aslanbek Alanovich Sotiev (born 29 September 1999) is a Russian freestyle wrestler who currently competes at 97 kilograms and represents North Ossetia–Alania in the national circuit. Sotiev is the reigning U23 European Continental champion and was a silver medalist at the 2018 U23 World Championships as well as the Russian National Championships (2020 and 2021).

Major results

External links 
 

Living people
1999 births
Place of birth missing (living people)
Russian male sport wrestlers
20th-century Russian people
21st-century Russian people

References